This is the list of original programming currently and formerly broadcast by the Indian television channel Sony Entertainment Television (SET) in India.

Current broadcasts

Formerly broadcasts

Acquired series

Anthology series

Comedy series

Drama series

Horror/supernatural series

Mythological series

Reality/non-scripted programming

Hindi dubbed shows

Animated series

Specials

See also
List of programmes broadcast by Sony SAB
Sony Pal

References

Sony TV
S